Grevillea helmsiae, commonly known as Helms' grevillea, is a species of flowering plant in the family Proteaceae and is endemic to Queensland. It is a shrub or tree with elliptic to narrowly egg-shaped leaves with the narrower end towards the base and small clusters of white to cream-coloured flowers with a green style.

Description

Taxonomy
Grevillea helmsiae was first formally described in 1899 by Frederick Manson Bailey in the Queensland Agricultural Journal from specimens collected near Childers by "Mrs. R. Helms". The specific epithet (helmsiae) honours Sabine Helms, who collected the type specimens.

Distribution and habitat
Helms' grevillea grows on the edges of rainforest, in dry rainforest and brigalow communities in Queensland, south from Rockhampton.

References

helmsiae
Flora of Queensland
Proteales of Australia
Plants described in 1899
Taxa named by Frederick Manson Bailey